Kakko may refer to:

 Kakko (instrument), a Japanese double-headed drum
 , a type of Finnish bread baked mostly in the region of Satakunta

People 
 Kakko (singer) (born 1969), Japanese actress and singer
 Kakko of Friuli (died 617), joint duke of Friuli

People with the surname 
 Erik Kakko (born 1971), Finnish ice hockey player
 Kaapo Kakko (born 2001), Finnish ice hockey player
 Minea Blomqvist-Kakko (born 1985), Finnish golfer
 Roope Kakko (born 1982), Finnish golfer
 Tony Kakko (born 1975), Finnish singer-songwriter

Finnish-language surnames